Luis Eduardo Koster Peña (24 March 1942 – 14 November 2021) was a Uruguayan basketball player. He competed in the men's tournament at the 1964 Summer Olympics. He died on 14 November 2021, at the age of 79.

References

External links
 

1942 births
2021 deaths
Uruguayan men's basketball players
Olympic basketball players of Uruguay
Basketball players at the 1964 Summer Olympics
People from Soriano Department